Collège Mérici is a private college, the equivalent of a CEGEP, in Quebec City, Quebec, Canada. The college was founded in 1930, and was named in honour of Italian saint Angela Merici. The current director is Nicole Bilodeau.

External links 
College webpage

Colleges in Quebec
Private schools in Quebec
Schools in Quebec City